Marti Electronics, a division of BE, manufactures RF Remote Pick-Up equipment for the broadcast industry. Marti has been supplying such hardware since 1960 with few competitors in its very vertical market. Because this equipment was so ubiquitous for so many years, the words "Marti" and "RPU" have become almost synonymous among broadcast engineers.

Marti is headquartered in Quincy, Illinois.

References

Electronics companies of the United States
Electronics companies established in 1960
Manufacturing companies established in 1960
Quincy, Illinois